The Paravur Synagogue aka Parur Synagogue (Malayalam: പറവൂർ ജൂതപള്ളി) (Hebrew: בית הכנסת פראבור) is one of the largest and most complete among the Jewish synagogues in Kerala, located in North Paravur (Parur). Built by the Malabar Jews, it has undergone successive phases of destruction and reconstruction. The present synagogue complex dates to 1616 A.D., but it was built on top of a much older building speculated to have been constructed as early as 750 A.D or 1105 A.D., making it one of the oldest synagogues in India and the Common Wealth of Nations. It is currently non-operational as a synagogue for worship. It has been renovated by the Government of Kerala and is open to public visits as the Kerala Jews History Museum.

History 
Jewish people (Malabar Jews) had been arriving in Kerala since 1st millennia BC for trading, and their communities were mostly settled around today's Kodungallur region (which was then a trading port named Muziris) and Kollam. They received royal patronage and special rights from the local Chera kings such as Cheraman Perumal and established Synagogues at their respective settlements for public worship.
This was documented in the copper plates dated 10th century AD issued by Bhaskara Ravi Varman to the Jewish community leader Joseph Rabban.

In the 14th century AD, after the Periyar Flood of 1341 (that also caused a Tsunami, according to some sources ), the community had to relocate to nearby towns such as Paravur, Chendamangalam and Kochi. Memories of this incident were preserved by oral tradition through traditional songs in Jewish Malayalam.

The Paravur Synagogue is among the oldest synagogues that still exist in Kerala and is also the largest Synagogue complex.
The current synagogue was built in 1615 AD at the Jewish street of Paravur and very close to the Paravur Market where the Jewish community had settled and worked as traders.
However, traditional accounts hint at a much older heritage, indicating that it was built on top of the ruins of an older synagogue dated 1165 AD.

Synagogue in the Piyyutim of Cochin Jews 
Although the community lived peacefully throughout their history among the locals, there were conflicts due to foreign invaders such as Mysore Kingdom (during the Malabar raids led by Hyder Ali and his son Tipu Sultan during the 18th century) and European colonizers such as Portuguese and Dutch during 16th and 17th centuries. According to a traditional Jewish Malayalam song, the synagogue was put to fire in 1662, most likely by the Portuguese, at around the same time when the Paradesi Synagogue near Fort Kochi was also burnt.

After the modern State of Israel was established in 1948, the Paravur Jews started to make Aliyah. As of 1949, there were about three hundred Jews still living in Paravur, but most of them immigrated to Israel in large numbers by the mid 1950s.
By 1970s, the public worship at the Synagogue ceased as the minyan (the quorum or minimum number of 10 Jewish adults required to conduct worship) could not be met and the Synagogue largely remained unattended during later decades.
The last ever worship service was conducted in 1988.

According to a report by the International Survey of Jewish Monuments (ISJM), the original bimah and the ark (containing Torah scrolls) were moved to Israel in 1995 and preserved there.

Kerala Jews Lifestyle Museum 
In 1996, the synagogue was declared as a protected monument, however it continued to remain mostly neglected until 2009 when it was handed over to the Kerala State Department of Archaeology.
Since 2010, the Government renovated the dilapidated structure as part of the Muziris Heritage Project and converted this into a museum to highlight the Jewish heritage of Kerala. They were opened to public in 2014.

Paravur Jews

Architecture 
The Paravur Synagogue is built with a unique blend of traditional Jewish Synagogue architecture as well as Kerala architectural styles. This is most evident in the use of padippura (arched gateway) along the path that leads to the main building.

Structure

Gatehouse (padippura) 
Similar to the architecture of other synagogues in Kerala, it has a balcony and a separate gallery for women to assemble, with direct access from outside through a staircase.

The exterior inner wall of the Synagogue compound also holds a plaque dated 1616, with Hebrew text engraved on a stone slab under the name of David Ya’acov Castiel Mudaliar, the fourth Mudaliyar (community leader) of the Kerala Jews, who was instrumental in the rebuilding of the Synagogue.

Breezeway

Main Sanctuary

Azara

Interior

Paravur Jewish Cemetery

Gallery

See also 
 Chendamangalam Synagogue about 5 km away, along the Periyar river
 Kottakkavu Mar Thoma Church dated 52 AD, about 400 m away.
 Mala Synagogue
 Kochangadi Synagogue
 List of Synagogues in Kerala
 Muziris
 Pattanam
 Kottapuram

References 

North Paravur
Synagogues in Kerala
Synagogues preserved as museums
Cochin Jews